Cyperus burkartii is a species of sedge that is native to parts of Argentina.

See also 
 List of Cyperus species

References 

burkartii
Plants described in 1990
Flora of Argentina